Otto Szabó (born 1 March 1981) is a Slovak football defender of Hungarian ethnicity. He currently plays for the club FK DAC 1904 Dunajská Streda.

Szabó played first international match for Slovakia against San Marino on 13 October 2007.

References

External links
 Győri ETO FC first team
 

1981 births
Living people
Footballers from Bratislava
Hungarians in Slovakia
Slovak footballers
Association football defenders
Slovakia international footballers
SK Rapid Wien players
MTK Budapest FC players
FC Sopron players
Debreceni VSC players
Vasas SC players
FC DAC 1904 Dunajská Streda players
ŠK Slovan Bratislava players
FC Petržalka players
Győri ETO FC players
Lombard-Pápa TFC footballers
Slovak Super Liga players
Nemzeti Bajnokság I players
Austrian Football Bundesliga players
Slovak expatriate footballers
Expatriate footballers in Austria
Expatriate footballers in Hungary
Slovak expatriate sportspeople in Austria
Slovak expatriate sportspeople in Hungary